Timeship is a video game published by Five Star Software.

Gameplay
Timeship is a game in which the players are able to travel through the time stream in a role-playing adventure.

Reception
Jasper Sylvester reviewed the game for Computer Gaming World, and stated that "I am impressed with TS as a potentially interesting game system, but was disappointed with the way the introductory module failed to make use of the strengths of the system."

References

Role-playing video games